A list of films produced in the Soviet Union in 1962 (see 1962 in film).

1962

See also
1962 in the Soviet Union

External links
 Soviet films of 1962 at the Internet Movie Database

1962
Soviet
Films